Arena Fyn, officially known as the Jyske Bank Arena for sponsorship reasons, is a sports and concert arena in the southeastern part of the Danish city of Odense.

Construction
The agreement about the construction of Arena Fyn was made in autumn 2005 and by March 2007 the arena was finished. The price of building was 90 million Danish kroner.

Use
The Scottish band Travis had a concert in the arena in the October 2007. It is also used for sports, including the Nordea Danish Open. The handball HC Odense (formerly Team Odense GOG) has played their home games in the arena. The Denmark Open has been held in Arena Fyn since 2007.

The sports equipment shop Stadium has sponsored the arena since June 2010.

Arena Fyn held the Dansk Melodi Grand Prix, on 8 March 2014, to select Denmark's entry for the 59th annual Eurovision Song Contest 2014, in Copenhagen. One week later, Arena Fyn held MGP Junior, a kids version of Dansk Melodi Grand Prix.

See also
List of indoor arenas in Denmark
List of indoor arenas in Nordic countries

References

External links 
Info about the arena on OSE's website 

Indoor arenas in Denmark
Sports venues completed in 2005
Buildings and structures in Odense
Sports venues in Denmark
Music venues completed in 2005